Altura is a neighbourhood in the town of Trieste, Italy, region of Friuli Venezia Giulia. It was established in the 1970s, is located circa  from the centre of Trieste and has a population of about 3,400 inhabitants.

References

Neighbourhoods in Italy
Geography of Trieste